Sinularia is a genus of soft coral in the family Alcyoniidae. They are commonly known as leather corals and currently have 166 described species in the genus.

Species
Species include:

References

Encyclopedia of Life entry

Alcyoniidae
Octocorallia genera